Eilidh McCreadie is a radio drama director and producer for BBC Radio Drama at Pacific Quay, Glasgow. She directed two episodes of The No. 1 Ladies' Detective Agency broadcast on Christmas Day 2009, and four further episodes (ninth and tenth series) in 2014–15.

Radio Plays

References

BBC Radio drama directors
BBC radio producers
Living people
Year of birth missing (living people)
Women radio producers